Alyssa Wohlfeiler is an American ice hockey forward, currently playing with the  Connecticut Whale in the Premier Hockey Federation (PHF).

Career 
Across 133 games with Northeastern, Wohlfeiler scored 71 points. She would serve as the team's captain in her final year.

After graduating, she signed with the Boston Blades in the CWHL. She would play three seasons with the team, putting up 23 points in 52 games.

In 2014, she left North America to sign with HC Lugano, with who she would score 29 points in 18 games as the team won the national championship. After one season in Switzerland, she signed with the Connecticut Whale in the newly formed Premier Hockey Federation, scoring 7 points in 17 games. She would only spend one season with the team, before returning to Europe to play for HV71 in Sweden and then EC Bergkamener Bären in Germany.

In August 2019, she returned to the NWHL to sign with the Boston Pride. In her first season with the Pride, she would score 16 points in 14 games, as the team finished first in league standings.

It was announced in June 2020 that she would be returning to her prior PHF team Connecticut Whale.

Wohlfeiler scored the first goal under the PHF name, after they had rebranded from NWHL.

Personal life 
Wohlfeiler has a degree in criminal justice.

References

External links
 

1989 births
Living people
21st-century American women
American women's ice hockey forwards
Boston Blades players
Boston Pride players
Connecticut Whale (PHF) players
HC Lugano players
HV71 players
Ice hockey players from California
Northeastern Huskies women's ice hockey players
Northeastern University alumni